Deinocerites is a genus of mosquitoes in the family Culicidae. There are about 18 described species in Deinocerites.

Species
These 18 species belong to the genus Deinocerites:

Clogmia albipunctata (Williston, 1893)
Deinocerites atlanticus Adames, 1971
Deinocerites barretoi Adames, 1971
Deinocerites belkini Adames, 1971
Deinocerites cancer Theobald, 1901 (crabhole mosquito)
Deinocerites colombianus Adames, 1971
Deinocerites costaricensis Adames & Hogue, 1969
Deinocerites curiche Adames, 1971
Deinocerites dyari Belkin & Hogue, 1959
Deinocerites epitedeus (Knab, 1907)
Deinocerites howardi Belkin & Hogue, 1959
Deinocerites magnus (Theobald, 1901)
Deinocerites mathesoni Belkin & Hogue, 1959
Deinocerites mcdonaldi Belkin & Hogue, 1959
Deinocerites melanophylum Dyar & Knab, 1907
Deinocerites nicoyae Adames & Hogue, 1969
Deinocerites panamensis Adames, 1971
Deinocerites pseudes Dyar & Knab, 1909
Deinocerites spanius (Dyar & Knab, 1909)

References

Further reading

 
 
 
 

Culicinae
Articles created by Qbugbot
Taxa named by Frederick Vincent Theobald